Union Hill-Novelty Hill is a census-designated place (CDP) in King County, Washington, United States. The area was first recognized by the Census Bureau in the 2000 census. The population was 18,805 at the 2010 census.

Based on per capita income, Union Hill-Novelty Hill ranks 5th of 522 areas in the state of Washington to be ranked.

Geography
Union Hill-Novelty Hill is located in northern King County at  (47.678674, −122.049198). It is bordered to the west by the city of Redmond, and a separate portion of the city, comprising the Redmond Watershed Preserve, is surrounded by the northern part of the CDP. To the north is the Cottage Lake CDP, and Washington State Route 202 runs along the southern edge of the community in the valley of Evans Creek and Patterson Creek.

Demographics
As of the census of 2000, there were 11,265 people, 3,584 households, and 3,103 families residing in the CDP. The population density was 462.9 people per square mile (178.7/km2). There were 3,677 housing units at an average density of 151.1/sq mi (58.3/km2). The racial makeup of the CDP was 90.77% White, 0.78% African American, 0.39% Native American, 4.25% Asian, 0.06% Pacific Islander, 1.30% from other races, and 2.45% from two or more races. Hispanic or Latino people of any race were 3.45% of the population.

There were 3,584 households, out of which 53.4% had children under the age of 18 living with them, 78.7% were married couples living together, 4.9% had a female householder with no husband present, and 13.4% were non-families. 9.0% of all households were made up of individuals, and 2.0% had someone living alone who was 65 years of age or older. The average household size was 3.14 and the average family size was 3.37.

In the CDP the population was spread out, with 33.3% under the age of 18, 5.1% from 18 to 24, 31.2% from 25 to 44, 26.0% from 45 to 64, and 4.3% who were 65 years of age or older. The median age was 36 years. For every 100 females there were 106.7 males. For every 100 females age 18 and over, there were 102.5 males.

The median income for a household in the CDP was $98,061, and the median income for a family was $105,758. Males had a median income of $77,954 versus $46,167 for females. The per capita income for the CDP was $58,285. About 2.3% of families and 2.9% of the population were below the poverty line, including 2.6% of those under age 18 and 3.5% of those age 65 or over.

Education
Most of the community is in the Lake Washington School District. Other portions are in the  Riverview School District and in the Snoqualmie Valley School District.

References

Census-designated places in King County, Washington